In Greek mythology, Chrysothemis or Khrysothemis ("golden law")  is a name ascribed to several characters.

Female:
 Chrysothemis, may refer to known as the attributes of the golden harvest as an agricultural demi-goddess. She is also the daughter of the goddess Demeter ("earth mother") and Karmanor ("he who crops").
Chrysothemis, a Hesperide pictured and named on an ancient vase together with Asterope, Hygieia and Lipara.
 Chrysothemis, daughter of Danaus. She married (and killed) Asterides, son of Aegyptus.
 Chrysothemis, wife of Staphylus, mother of Molpadia, Rhoeo and Parthenos. She was also said to have mothered Parthenos by the god Apollo.
 Chrysothemis, daughter of Agamemnon and Clytemnestra.  Unlike her sister, Electra, Chrysothemis did not protest or enact vengeance against their mother for having an affair with Aegisthus and then killing their father. She appears in Sophocles's Electra.
Male:
Chrysothemis, the first winner of the oldest contest held at the Pythian Games, the singing of a hymn to Apollo. He was a son of Carmanor, the priest who cleansed Apollo for the killing of Python.

Notes

References
 Avery, Catherine B. The New Century Classical Handbook, Appleton-Century-Crofts, 1962. p. 284.
 Diodorus Siculus, The Library of History translated by Charles Henry Oldfather. Twelve volumes. Loeb Classical Library. Cambridge, Massachusetts: Harvard University Press; London: William Heinemann, Ltd. 1989. Vol. 3. Books 4.59–8. Online version at Bill Thayer's Web Site
Diodorus Siculus, Bibliotheca Historica. Vol 1-2. Immanel Bekker. Ludwig Dindorf. Friedrich Vogel. in aedibus B. G. Teubneri. Leipzig. 1888-1890. Greek text available at the Perseus Digital Library.
 Grimal, Pierre, The Dictionary of Classical Mythology, Wiley-Blackwell, 1996, . "Carmanor"
Hyginus, Gaius Julius, Astronomica from The Myths of Hyginus translated and edited by Mary Grant. University of Kansas Publications in Humanistic Studies. Online version at the Topos Text Project.
Hyginus, Gaius Julius, Fabulae from The Myths of Hyginus translated and edited by Mary Grant. University of Kansas Publications in Humanistic Studies. Online version at the Topos Text Project.
Homer, The Iliad with an English Translation by A.T. Murray, Ph.D. in two volumes. Cambridge, MA., Harvard University Press; London, William Heinemann, Ltd. 1924. . Online version at the Perseus Digital Library.
Homer, Homeri Opera in five volumes. Oxford, Oxford University Press. 1920. . Greek text available at the Perseus Digital Library.
 Manas, John H., Divination Ancient and Modern: An Historical Archaeological and Philosophical Approach to Seership and Christian Religion, Kessinger Publishing, 2004. . p. 121
 Parada, Carlos, Genealogical Guide to Greek Mythology, Jonsered, Paul Åströms Förlag, 1993. .
Pausanias, Description of Greece with an English Translation by W.H.S. Jones, Litt.D., and H.A. Ormerod, M.A., in 4 Volumes. Cambridge, MA, Harvard University Press; London, William Heinemann Ltd. 1918. . Online version at the Perseus Digital Library
Pausanias, Graeciae Descriptio. 3 vols. Leipzig, Teubner. 1903.  Greek text available at the Perseus Digital Library.
 Perseus Encyclopedia, "Chrysothemis"
Pseudo-Apollodorus, The Library with an English Translation by Sir James George Frazer, F.B.A., F.R.S. in 2 Volumes, Cambridge, MA, Harvard University Press; London, William Heinemann Ltd. 1921. . Online version at the Perseus Digital Library. Greek text available from the same website.
 Rigoglioso, Marguerite, The Cult of Divine Birth in Ancient Greece, Macmillan, 2009. . p. 113.
 Smith, William; Dictionary of Greek and Roman Biography and Mythology, London (1873).
 Smith, William; A Dictionary of Greek and Roman Antiquities, London (1890).
 Walters, Henry Beauchamp and Samuel Birch, History of ancient pottery: Greek, Etruscan, and Roman, Volume 2, J. Murray, 1905. p.92.

Hesperides
Nymphs
Danaids
Princesses in Greek mythology
Women of Apollo
Children of Agamemnon
Cretan characters in Greek mythology